Hessite is a mineral form of disilver telluride (Ag2Te). It is a soft, dark grey telluride mineral which forms monoclinic crystals.

It is named after Germain Henri Hess (1802–1850).

Hessite is found in the US in Eagle County, Colorado and in Calaveras County, California and in many other locations.

Stützite (Ag7Te4) and empressite (AgTe) are related silver telluride minerals.

References 

Silver minerals
Telluride minerals
Monoclinic minerals
Minerals in space group 14
Minerals described in 1843